Rixe was a German bicycle, moped, and small motorcycle factory in Brake, Bielefeld. 

The company was founded in 1922. Also, motorcycles were produced at the time of the motorcycle boom in the 1950s, there were engines of companies Sachs and ILO installed. The most powerful version was equipped with a  ILO 2-cylinder engine with 18 PS. Rixe did build many mopeds and scooters, which initially looked more like bicycles with a motor installed. Even today there are many Rixe- mopeds in use.

The traditional history of the company ended in  1984 when the plants were closed and relocated to the People's Republic of China. The brand is now part bicycle manufacturer Derby Cycle Werke where it was used till 2021 as a mark for the Zweirad Einkaufs Genossenschaft (ZEG)/CPD co-op.

See also
 Rix (disambiguation)

References

External links
 Rixe official site

Cycle manufacturers of Germany